The 38th Saturn Awards, honoring the best in science fiction, fantasy and horror film and television in 2011, were held on July 26, 2012 in Burbank, California. The awards are presented by the Academy of Science Fiction, Fantasy and Horror Films.

The six Best Film Award categories were respectively won by Rise of the Planet of the Apes (Science Fiction), Harry Potter and the Deathly Hallows – Part 2 (Fantasy), The Girl with the Dragon Tattoo (Horror or Thriller), Mission: Impossible – Ghost Protocol (Action or Adventure), The Skin I Live In (International) and Puss in Boots (Animated). Rise of the Planet of the Apes and Super 8 led the winners with three each.

In the television categories, Breaking Bad won three of its six nominations, including Best Syndicated/Cable Television Series. Fringe, The Walking Dead and Teen Wolf won the other Best Series Awards.

Harry Potter and the Deathly Hallows – Part 2 became the first Harry Potter film to win Best Fantasy Film, for which the seven previous Harry Potter films were nominated, and only the second film of the series to win a Saturn Award, following The Philosopher's Stone which won Best Costume in 2001. Mission: Impossible – Ghost Protocol also became the first Mission:Impossible film to win Best Action or Adventure Film, following the nominations of the first and third installments.

Winners and nominees 
These are the winners and nominees for the 38th Annual Saturn Awards.

Special awards 

 The George Pal Memorial Award: Martin Scorsese
 The Life Career Award: Frank Oz and James Remar
 The Filmmakers Showcase Award: Drew Goddard
 The Milestone Award: The Simpsons
 The Innovator Award: Robert Kirkman
 The Appreciation Award: Jeffrey Ross (for hosting the Saturn Awards)

Film

Television

Programs

Acting

DVD

Multiple nominations

Film
The following 22 films received multiple nominations:
 10 nominations: Harry Potter and the Deathly Hallows – Part 2 and Hugo
 8 nominations: Super 8
 7 nominations: Captain America: The First Avenger
 6 nominations: The Adventures of Tintin and Mission: Impossible – Ghost Protocol
 5 nominations: Rise of the Planet of the Apes
 4 nominations: The Skin I Live In, Take Shelter, and Thor
 3 nominations: Immortals and Melancholia
 2 nominations: The Adjustment Bureau, Another Earth, The Devil's Double, Fast Five, The Girl with the Dragon Tattoo, Midnight in Paris, Sherlock Holmes: A Game of Shadows, The Thing, War Horse, and X-Men: First Class

Television
The following 12 television series received multiple nominations:
 6 nominations: Breaking Bad
 5 nominations: American Horror Story
 4 nominations: Dexter, Fringe, Game of Thrones.  The Killing, Leverage, and Torchwood: Miracle Day
 2 nominations: The Closer, Falling Skies, Once Upon a Time, and The Walking Dead

References

External links

 Official Saturn Awards website

Saturn Awards ceremonies
Saturn
2011 film awards
2011 television awards
2012 in California